Kardamili (variously transliterated as Kardamyle, Cardamyle, Kardhamili, and Kardamyli, and sometimes called "Skardamoula", especially on old maps) is a town by the sea thirty-five kilometers southeast of Kalamata, Greece.  It is the seat of the municipality of Lefktro in the region of Messenia on the Mani Peninsula.

In the Iliad (Book 9), Homer cites Kardamili as one of the seven cities offered by Agamemnon to Achilles as a condition to rejoin the fight during the Trojan War.  The village preserves its ancient name.

The area is filled with beaches: Ritsa, Belogianni, Salio, Tikla, Amoni, Santava.  The older town includes a mediaeval castle and outworks, and the imposing church of Saint Spyridon. Many of the buildings of Old Kardamili, also known as Pano Kardamili, or "Upper Kardamili" were built by the Venetians and feature a mix of traditional Greek and Venetian design. The skyline of Kardamyli, like many other Maniot towns and villages, is dominated by the distinctive regional architectural of the various towers built by scions of the Nikliani clans, the mediaeval aristocracy of the Mani. 

Kardamyli is the departure point of many mountain trails, some of which lead to the peak of Mount Taygetus. Kardamili is known in the area for having an especially good view of Mount Taygetus, known locally as Profitis Ilias, literally translating to "Prophet Elias". Nearby is the Viros Gorge, with a total length of 20 km.  The Viros Gorge remains bone dry in summer, however it is known to flood heavily in winter, when snow melts on the mountains and rain falls in heavy downpours. Further afield, one may visit Oitylo, Areopoli and the Diros caverns.

The village of Kalamitsi, just outside Kardamili was, in his later years, the principal home of Patrick Leigh Fermor and his wife Joan.  Patrick was an English writer who was made an honorary citizen of the village for his participation in the Greek Resistance during World War II, especially in Crete. He died in hospital in 2011 the day after returning to his other home in Dumbleton in England. 

The ashes of the writer Bruce Chatwin were scattered near a Byzantine chapel above the village in 1989.

Climate

Kardamili, like much of Greece, experiences a very mild, subtropical Mediterranean climate, with hot, dry summers and cool, wet winters. Snow is almost unknown in the town itself, only falling a few times per century. Snow is, however, common in the mountains above Kardamili, with the Profitis Ilias typically remaining snow capped until early June. Winter rainfall in the area is often heavy, with spectacular flooding in the Viros gorge occurring every few years. In summer, by contrast, rain is scarce. Summer thunderstorms are exceptionally rare, bringing short, heavy downpours. Summertime temperatures usually range around 90–95°F (32–35°C), but heat waves with temperatures above 100°F (38°C) are common. The cooling Meltemi wind which blows across much of Greece is largely blocked by the mountains of the area, resulting in unusually calm seas which are often lake-like in the morning, before the sea breeze kicks up. Spring and Fall are warm to cool with changeable weather. Heavy hailstorms are known to strike the area in early spring and mid fall, sometimes causing damage to the local olive crop, as the olives or flowers are knocked out of their trees by falling hailstones.

Global warming and climate change are especially felt in the area, with summers becoming more tropical – featuring higher humidity with occasional afternoon thunderstorms and warmer nights. Winters are becoming warmer and drier. Due to these climatic changes, tropical plants such as mango, avocado, lychee, and plumeria are becoming a more common sight in the area, giving the town an exotic and lush feel. At night, the town often smells of these new tropical flowers and jasmine, as well as eucalyptus, as light mountain breezes blow the smells through the town.

The following is climate data for nearby Kalamata. It is important to note that winter low temperatures tend to be a bit higher than those of Kalamata as the Taygetos block much of the northerly winds which bring cold air down from the rest of Europe.

Geography
Kardamili sits at the foot of the Taygetus mountains on the coast of the Messenian Bay. Much of the town sits on the remnants of a prehistoric lava flow, the remains of which can be seen as the lava rock outcrops which separate many of the local beaches from one another. The local beaches stand out from those in other areas of the world for the remarkably round stones of which they are made up. Nowhere else in the world is it possible to find smooth, often spherical stones on a beach, and the phenomenon has been subject to multiple studies done to find the cause of such a unique occurrence. The nearest places are Kampos to the North and Proastio to the southeast.

History
Kardamili is one of the oldest settlements in the Peloponnese, with its current name being mentioned in the Iliad, the epic poem by ancient Greek writer Homer. Many of the townspeople can trace their lineage back to either famed clans of the area (as in the Mourtzinos and Troupakis clans), or the Byzantine Emperor Constantine Palaiologos, one of whose descendants (Dimitri Palaiologos) settled in the region. The descendants of Dimitris Palaiologos typically have the last name "Dimitreas", meaning "son of Dimitri'.

Historical sites
The buildings of Pano Kardamili, dating back to Venetian times.
The church of St. Spyridon.
The tombs of the Dioskouri, Castor and Pollux (the Gemini twins) are believed to be near a hiking trail just above the old town.
The ruins of the old soap factory, the smokestack of which still dominates the town's skyline.
The old customs house, in St. John's harbor.

Gallery

References

External links 

 https://www.kardamili-greece.com/ Official website
 http://www.zorbas.de/webcam/ekardamyli.php Webcam view above the old harbour

Populated places in Messenia
Populated places in the Mani Peninsula